Biagetti is an Italian surname. Notable people with the surname include:

Biagio Biagetti (1877–1948), Italian painter and art restorer
Giuliano Biagetti (1925–1998), Italian film director and screenwriter

Italian-language surnames
Surnames of Italian origin